Moon Seong-hyun (born June 2, 2006), is a South Korean actor.

Filmography

Television series

Web series

References

External links
Moon Seong-hyun at FNC Entertainment
 

2006 births
Living people
21st-century South Korean male actors
South Korean male child actors
South Korean male television actors
South Korean male web series actors
People from Seoul
Male actors from Seoul